Inside America is a 2010 English-language Austrian drama film written and directed by Barbara Eder. The film is Eder's debut and it won the Special Jury Prize at the Max Ophüls Film Festival.

Cast
 Patty Barrera as Patty
 Raul I. Juarez as Manni
 Carlos Benavides as Carlos
 Edward K. Bravo as Lalo
 Luis De Los Santos as Ricky
 Zuleyma Jaime as Zuly
 Roberto A. Perez as Fuego
 Aimee Lizette Saldivar as Aimee
 Carolyn Sanchez as Carol

References

External links
 

2010 films
Austrian drama films
2010 drama films
2010 directorial debut films
2010s English-language films